Karanam (also spelled as Karnam), is a title and surname native to the Indian states of Andhra Pradesh and Telangana. Traditionally, Karanam or Karnam was a title used by people who maintained the accounts and records of the villages and used in collecting taxes. The post was usually held by either Niyogi Brahmins or Karan Kayastha or Deshastha Brahmins. The title Karanam is similar to Kulkarni in North Karnataka and Maharashtra and Shanbhaug in Karnataka.

Notable people
Notable people with the surname include:
Karanam Balaram Krishna Murthy - Indian politician from Andhra Pradesh.
Karanam Pavan Prasad - Indian author, artist and playwright in Kannada language.
Karnam Malleswari - Indian weightlifter.
Karnam Venkatachalam - Government official during British Raj times.

References

Surnames
Indian surnames
Indian feudalism
Indian words and phrases